PoliScan speed is a system for traffic enforcement made by Vitronic. The measurement is based on lidar (light radar). By time-of-flight measurement, a scanning laser determines speeds and positions of all vehicles in the measurement area.

PoliScan speed is available as a mobile or a stationary system.

Apart from the use as speed camera, the systems of the PoliScan family are also used as red light camera and for automatic number plate recognition.

External links 
 Manufacturer's web site

Traffic law
Laser applications
Traffic management
Intelligent transportation systems